A referendum on the approval of the Basque Statute of Autonomy was held in the Basque Country on Thursday, 25 October 1979. Voters were asked whether they ratified a proposed Statute of Autonomy of the Basque Country bill organizing the historical territories of Álava, Biscay and Gipuzkoa into an autonomous community of Spain. The final draft of the bill had been approved by the Basque parliamentary assembly on 29 December 1978, but it required ratification through a binding referendum and its subsequent approval by the Spanish Cortes Generales, as established by Article 151 of the Spanish Constitution of 1978.

The question asked was "Do you approve of the Statute of Autonomy of the Basque Country Bill?". The referendum resulted in 94.6% of valid votes in support of the bill on a turnout of 58.9%. Once approved, the bill was submitted to the consideration of the Cortes Generales, which accepted it on 29 November (in the Congress of Deputies) and 12 December (in the Spanish Senate), receiving royal assent on 18 December and published in the Official State Gazette on 22 December 1979.

Results

Overall

Results by province

See also
1979 Catalan Statute of Autonomy referendum
1980 Andalusian autonomy initiative referendum
1980 Galician Statute of Autonomy referendum
1981 Andalusian Statute of Autonomy referendum

References

1979 in the Basque Country (autonomous community)
1979 referendums
Basque politics
Referendums in the Basque Country (autonomous community)
October 1979 events in Europe
Basque Country